Rana Ahmad may refer to:

 Rana Ahmad alias Rana Ahmad Hamd (born 1985), female Saudi Arabian-born German author, atheist and women's rights activist
 Rana Maqbool Ahmad, male Pakistani politician
 Rana Riaz Ahmad, male Pakistani politician
 Rana Shahbaz Ahmad, male Pakistani politician
 Rana Iqbal Ahmad Khan (born before 1947), male Pakistani lawyer and former politician
 Rana Mashhood Ahmad Khan, male Pakistani politician
 Rana Ijaz Ahmad Noon (born 1968), male Pakistani politician

See also 
 Ahmad
 Rana (name)